C.J. Marable (born February 2, 1997) is an American football running back for the Birmingham Stallions of the United States Football League (USFL). He played college football at Presbyterian and Coastal Carolina.

Professional career

Chicago Bears
Marable was signed by the Chicago Bears as an undrafted free agent on May 14, 2021. He was waived on August 24, 2021, at the end of training camp.

Birmingham Stallions
Marable was selected in the 28th round of the 2022 USFL Draft by the Birmingham Stallions. He was transferred to the team's inactive roster on May 20, 2022, with a knee injury.

References

1997 births
Living people
People from Decatur, Georgia
Players of American football from Georgia (U.S. state)
American football running backs
Chicago Bears players
Presbyterian Blue Hose football players
Coastal Carolina Chanticleers football players
Birmingham Stallions (2022) players